Mikhail Vasilyevich Yeryomin (17 June 1968 – 30 June 1991) was a Soviet football goalkeeper.

Career 
Mikhail Yeryomin started playing for CSKA Moscow in 1986. With this club he won USSR Football Championship in 1991 and Soviet Cup the same year.

He played one match for Soviet Union national team on 29 August 1990 in a friendly against Romania.

Death 
Late night on 23 June 1991, on the way home from USSR Cup Final won by his team, Yeryomin lost control of his vehicle due to a damaged tyre and crashed into a bus. He died from injuries in hospital on 30 June 1991.

In his memory CSKA established prize for The Best Young Goalkeeper of Top League. This prize was received amongst others by Dmitri Kharine and Sergei Ovchinnikov.

External links
 Profile 
 

1968 births
People from Zelenograd
1991 deaths
Soviet footballers
Association football goalkeepers
Russian footballers
Soviet Union under-21 international footballers
Soviet Top League players
PFC CSKA Moscow players
Soviet Union international footballers
Road incident deaths in the Soviet Union
FC Spartak Moscow players